Luis Algacir Vergílio da Silva (23 March 1973 – 23 January 2010) was a Brazilian para table tennis player. His highest rank was world number six in January 2005 in sports category 3 and has won his table tennis titles with Welder Knaf.

He died of cancer aged 36 in his hometown of Curitiba.

References

1973 births
2010 deaths
Sportspeople from Curitiba
Paralympic table tennis players of Brazil
Brazilian male table tennis players
Medalists at the 2008 Summer Paralympics
Table tennis players at the 2004 Summer Paralympics
Table tennis players at the 2008 Summer Paralympics
Paralympic medalists in table tennis
Paralympic silver medalists for Brazil
Medalists at the 2007 Parapan American Games
Deaths from cancer in Paraná (state)